Andricus quercusflocci is a species of gall wasp in the family Cynipidae.

References

Cynipidae
Articles created by Qbugbot
Insects described in 1864